Thucca was a town in the Roman province of Mauretania Sitifensis. Pliny the Elder describes it as "impositum mari et flumini Ampsagae" (overlooking the sea and the River Ampsaga), and thus on the border with Numidia.

Its site is now occupied by the ruins of Merdja in present-day Algeria

The town is referred to as Thucca in Mauretania to distinguish it from Thucca in Numidia, which is today Henchir-El-Abiodh, further east in Algeria.

Both towns became Christian bishoprics and are included in the Catholic Church's list of titular sees.

The names of two of the bishops of Thucca in Mauretania are known:
 Honoratus, who spoke at the Council of Carthage (255);
 Uzulus, one of the Catholic bishops that Huneric summoned to the Council of Carthage (484) and then exiled.

References

Catholic titular sees in Africa